Carol Lynn Wright Pearson (born December 1, 1939) is an American poet, author, screenwriter, and playwright.  A member of The Church of Jesus Christ of Latter-day Saints (LDS Church), Pearson is best known for her book Goodbye, I Love You, a memoir of her marriage to a gay man who died of AIDS in 1984.  She frequently addresses the topics of LGBT acceptance and the role of Latter-day Saint women.

Personal life
A fourth-generation Latter-day Saint, Pearson was born in Salt Lake City to Lelland Rider Wright and Emeline Sirrine Wright.  They would settle in Provo, where Pearson attended Brigham Young High School.  Her mother died of breast cancer when Carol Lynn was fifteen.  Carol Lynn studied music and theater at Brigham Young University (BYU), where she won the award for Best Actress two years in a row.

Pearson married actor, musician, and songwriter Gerald Neils Pearson (1942–1984), whom she had met in a college production of The Skin of Our Teeth, on September 9, 1966 in Salt Lake City, Utah.  The two were devout Latter-day Saints who both descended from several generations of church members.  They were married for 12 years and had four children together, settling in Provo, Utah.

Gerald had told Pearson while they were engaged that he had participated in sexual relationships with men, but had left that phase of his life behind.  Church authorities also assured the couple that marriage would turn Gerald into a heterosexual.  However, he eventually confronted his homosexuality and after a move to California prompted by his desire to explore this side of himself, they separated and were divorced in 1978.  He returned to live with her and their children after being diagnosed with AIDS in 1984, and she cared for him until his death.  Her book Goodbye, I Love You is about their life together.

Since then, Pearson has become an unofficial spokesperson for acceptance of gay people by their Latter-day Saint families, as well as a stronger leadership role for women in the broader church community.  Many of her works address these issues, and she speaks on these and related subjects around the country.  She notes, "I love the Mormon community ... and I have a unique opportunity to build bridges."

Pearson's daughter Emily (b. 1968) is an actress and writer who is the author of Dancing With Crazy (2011), a memoir of her life and family.  Pearson's elder son John (b. 1969) is a professional caricaturist and one of the original animators of The Simpsons; younger son Aaron Pearson (b. 1971) is a rock musician. Her youngest child, Katharine Sirrine "Katy" Pearson Adams (1975–1999), died of a brain tumor at the age of 23.  Pearson has four grandchildren. Pearson's former son-in-law, Steven Fales (b. 1970) is an internationally acclaimed solo performance artist most noted for his Mormon Boy Trilogy (2018) that tells his coming-out story. He is the father of two of Pearson's four grandchildren.

Works
Pearson is best known for her memoir Goodbye, I Love You and the LDS musical My Turn On Earth. Her play Facing East, about a Latter-day Saint family dealing with the suicide of a gay son, opened Off Broadway on May 29, 2007.  She also wrote One On The Seesaw, a lighthearted book about raising a family as a single parent.

Early in her career she published poetry and essays in various venues. Her plays Pegora the Witch and Think Your Way to a Million won statewide contests in Utah; a third, Martyr-in-Waiting, was published by the LDS Church's Mutual Improvement Association. She was employed at this time by BYU's motion-picture department. Her first book was the poetry collection, Beginnings, published in 1969.  Her other works include:

 The Search (1970)
 The Order is Love (1971)
 Daughters of Light (1973)
 Cipher in the Snow (screenplay) 1973
 The Growing Season (1976)
 The Flight and the Nest (1977)
 A Widening View (1983)
 Blow Out the Wishbone (1985)
 Goodbye, I Love You: The Story of a Wife, Her Homosexual Husband, and a Love Honored For Time And All Eternity (1987) 
 Lasting Peace (1990)
 Mother Wove the Morning (1992)
 Women I Have Known and Been (1993)
 Picture Windows:  A Carol Lynn Pearson Collection (1996)
 Morning Glory Mother (1997)
 The Lesson:  A Fable For Our Times (1998)
 What Love Is (1999)
 Fuzzy Red Bathrobe: Questions From the Heart For Mothers and Daughters (2000)
 Girlfriend, You Are the Best! (2001)
 Day-Old Child And Other Celebrations of Motherhood (2001)
 Will You Still Be My Daughter?  A Fable For Our Times (2001)
 A Strong Man:  A Fable For Our Times (2001)
 The Gift: A Fable For Our Times (2001)
 Consider the Butterfly: Transforming Your Life Through Meaningful Coincidence (2002)
 A Christmas Thief (2003) 
 The Modern Magi (2003)
 The Christmas Moment (2005) 
 Beginnings and Beyond (2005) 
 The Model Mormon Mother's Notebook (2005)  
 The Runaway Mother (2006)  
 A Stranger For Christmas (2007) 
 In Love Again and Always: Love Poems by Carol Lynn Pearson (2007)  
 The Dance (2007)  
 Summer of Truth (2007)  
 No More Goodbyes: Circling the Wagons Around Our Gay Loved Ones (2007)
 Priceless Moments: Snapshots of Motherhood (2008)  
 The Sweet, Still Waters of Home: Inspiration for Mothers from the twenty-third Psalm (2011) 
 The Ghost of Eternal Polygamy: Haunting the Hearts and Heaven of Mormon Women and Men (2016)
 I'll Walk With You (2020)  
 Finding Mother God: Poems to Heal the World'' (2020)

References

External links
 
 
 Mormon Stories Podcast Interview: 173-177: Carol Lynn Pearson – Mormon Author, Poet, Playwright, Feminist, and Philosopher
 A 30 May 2007 article in Playbill: "Facing East, Drama of a Shaken Mormon Family"
 Mormon Matters Podcast Interview: 336: The Ghost of Eternal Polygamy by Dan Wotherspoon (18 July 2016)

1939 births
American Latter Day Saint writers
American women non-fiction writers
American women poets
Brigham Young University alumni
LGBT and Mormonism
Latter Day Saint poets
Latter Day Saints from California
Latter Day Saints from Utah
Living people
Mormon feminists
Mormon memoirists
People from Walnut Creek, California
Writers from Salt Lake City
Brigham Young High School alumni